The USA Darts Classic is a darts tournament that has been held since 2005.

List of winners

Men's

Ladies

References

External links
Official American Darts Organization website

Darts tournaments